That's How Love Goes may refer to:
 "That's How Love Goes", a song by Jermaine Jackson from Jermaine
 "That's How Love Goes", a song by Katey Sagal from Well...
 "That's How Love Goes", a song by Boyzone from Where We Belong